"Going Where the Lonely Go" is a song written and recorded by American country music artist Merle Haggard backed by The Strangers.  It was released in October 1982 as the first single and title track from the album Going Where the Lonely Go.  The song was his twenty-eighth number one country single.  The single went to number one for one week and spent a total of thirteen weeks on the country chart.

Personnel
Merle Haggard– vocals, guitar

The Strangers:
 Roy Nichols – guitar, harmonica
 Norm Hamlet – steel guitar, dobro
 Tiny Moore – fiddle, mandolin
 Bobby Wayne – guitar, background vocals
 Mark Yeary – piano
 Jimmy Belkin – fiddle
 Dennis Hromek – bass
 Biff Adam – drums
 Don Markham – trumpet, saxophone

Charts

Weekly charts

Year-end charts

References

1982 singles
1982 songs
Merle Haggard songs
Songs written by Merle Haggard
Epic Records singles